Microcrambus rotarellus is a moth in the family Crambidae. It was described by Harrison Gray Dyar Jr. in 1927. It is found in Mexico.

References

Crambini
Moths described in 1927
Moths of Central America